Richard Gillachrist Moore (20 February 1931 – 15 May 2019), was a British journalist and Liberal Party politician. He was a leader writer at the News Chronicle and speechwriter to the Liberal Party Leader.

Background
Moore was born in London, the younger son of Sir Alan Moore and Hilda Mary Burrows. He was educated at Highfield School, Liphook and Radley College, Berkshire, gaining an exhibition to Trinity College, Cambridge in 1949. He was President of Cambridge University Liberal Club in 1953 and President of Cambridge Union in 1955. He was also Chairman of the Union of University Liberal Societies.

In 1955 he married Ann Miles. They had two sons Charles and Rowan, and daughter, Charlotte, seven grandchildren and a great-granddaughter.

Professional career
Moore was a leader writer for the News Chronicle (1956–60). He was secretary to the Liberal peers from 1960 and then political secretary and speechwriter to Jeremy Thorpe from 1967-73. He was secretary general of Liberal International.

Political career
Moore was Liberal candidate for Tavistock at the general elections of 1955 and 1959, Cambridgeshire 1961 and 1964, North Antrim 1966 and 1970 and North Norfolk in both 1974 elections.
He did not stand for parliament again. He was Liberal candidate in the 1984 European Elections for Somerset and Dorset West.

Electoral record

References

1931 births
2019 deaths
Liberal Party (UK) parliamentary candidates
Alumni of Trinity College, Cambridge
People educated at Radley College
Presidents of the Cambridge Union
Politicians from London
Secretaries
Speechwriters